Booral could refer to:

 Booral, New South Wales, a locality in the Mid-Coast Council, Australia
 Booral, Queensland, a locality in the Fraser Coast Region, Australia